Edward Brodie Ferguson (born 10 September 1949) was a Scottish footballer who played for Dunfermline Athletic, Dumbarton and Rotherham United.  In 1974, he emigrated to South Africa where he played for Cape Town City for eight seasons.

References

1949 births
Scottish footballers
Dumbarton F.C. players
Dunfermline Athletic F.C. players
Rotherham United F.C. players
Grimsby Town F.C. players
Scottish Football League players
Living people
English Football League players
Association football midfielders
People from Whitburn, West Lothian
Footballers from West Lothian